Politics of Tamil Nadu is the politics related to the Indian state of Tamil Nadu.

History of Tamil Nadu politics

Formation of Tamil Nadu 
The region of Tamil Nadu indicates historical records of human habitation at least for 3,800 years. The current state of Tamil Nadu was formed by renaming Madras State on 14 January 1969.

Pre-Dravidian politics of Tamil Nadu 
The era of pre-Dravidian politics of Tamil Nadu is dominated by the Indian National Congress (INC). The Indian National Congress was the ruling party of Tamil Nadu for the first twenty years after independence, until a Dravidian party, the Dravida Munnetra Kazhagam (DMK), swept the 1967 elections. Power has since shifted between the two major Dravidian parties of the state, the Dravida Munnetra Kazhagam and the All India Anna Dravida Munnetra Kazhagam (AIADMK).

K. Kamaraj was the most influential leader during the Congress era in Tamil Nadu. Kamaraj was instrumental in the ascension and downfall of the first six Chief Ministers of Tamil Nadu following independence: T. Prakasam, O.P. Ramaswamy Reddiar, Kumaraswamy Raja, C. Rajagopalachari, M. Bhakthavatsalam, and himself. Kamaraj originally threw his support behind T. Prakasam to prevent C. Rajagopalachari from becoming Chief Minister in 1946, however, Kamaraj felt it was too difficult to control Prakasam as he was Telugu and didn't feel the need to report to the Tamil Nadu Congress Committee. Kamaraj facilitated the ouster of Prakasam and the ascension of O.P. Ramaswamy Reddiar as Chief Minister in 1947. Ramaswamy and Kamaraj eventually had a falling out which led to Ramaswamy's downfall though he was Tamil and originally became Chief Minister with Kamaraj's support. Kamaraj eventually elevated Kumaraswamy Raja to the position of Chief Minister in 1949—a position which Raja retained till he lost his seat in the general election of 1952.

The general election of 1952 temporarily reduced the Congress Party to a minority in the state legislative assembly. Though Congress held the most seats in the state legislative assembly—152 out of 375, they did not meet the required 188 seats to prove a governing majority. In response, communist parties began to build a post-election coalition challenging the Congress party. The coalition, the United Democratic Front (UDF), comprised 30 independents as well as the Communist Party of India (CPI) and CPI backed independents, Kisan Mazdoor Praja Party (KMPP), Tamil Nadu Toilers Party, Commonweal Party, Forward Block (Marxist Group) also known as FBL (MG), All India Scheduled Caste Federation (SCF), and Justice Party (JUSP). With 166 legislative seats, the UDF staked their claim to form a government. The Governor at the time, Maharaja Krishna Kumarsinhji Bhavsinhji, decided to refer the matter to the President of India, Rajendra Prasad, rather than cause controversy at the end of his term as governor. Per the Constitution, the President sought the advice of the Prime Minister, Jawaharlal Nehru, who was unable to make a decision on the matter. With the situation at a standstill, Kamaraj was in favor of allowing the UDF to form a government as he believed the coalition government would be short-lived thus providing an opportunity for Congress to gain power back. However, many were opposed to Kamaraj's proposal as they were outraged by the possibility of a Communist government, and turned to Rajagopalachari, a staunch anti-Communist, to lead the government as Chief Minister. Set to lead the state government, Rajagopalachari decided he would not seek election to the state legislature as he believed it was below his status. As Rajagopalachari would not seek election to the lower house of the state legislature, the interim Chief Minister, Kumaraswamy Raja, promptly recommended Rajagopalachari's appointment to the upper house of the state legislature, and the new governor, Sri Prakasa, swiftly accepted the recommendation. Rajagopalachari was then invited by Prakasa to form the state government and asked to prove his majority in the state legislature. Rajagopalachari proved a majority more than three months later by convincing opposition members to defect, and allying himself with parties that had not joined the UDF.

Kamaraj increased his stronghold over Tamil Nadu politics following the separation of the Telugu-speaking areas from Tamil Nadu in 1953, and facilitated the removal of Rajagopalachari as Chief Minister in 1954 after Rajagopalachari's implementation of the unpopular Modified Scheme of Elementary Education. Kamaraj then ascended to the Chief Ministership himself, and would remain in that position for the next nine years.

As Chief Minister, Kamaraj paid special attention to education as that was the issue that led to his predecessor's downfall. Education was made compulsory and free to all children till the age of 14. 25,234 schools were opened between 1954 and 1962 so that villages with populations greater than 500 had at least one or more schools. At the same time, secondary education was restructured—mathematics, science, and social studies were made compulsory subjects, and students were provided the opportunity to learn their language of choice as well as Hindi and English. Enrollment in primary and secondary schools doubled from 1955 to 1962. By 1954, the state government had opened 140 training schools for teachers. In 1955, the Tamil Nadu government was the first in Asia to provide a provident fund, pensions, and insurance for teachers. The School Midday Meal Scheme launched in 1957 as an incentive to increase enrollment. Beginning in 1960, school uniforms were provided free of cost to children. The state government implemented the School Improvement Movement in 1958 which led to 24,656 schools receiving donations worth about 7,93,00,000 rupees from the public by 1963.

Irrigation was another major focus of the Tamil Nadu government as Kamaraj believed improved irrigation would increase food production and wanted to utilize the hydroelectric capabilities of dams and reservoirs. Nine large-scale irrigation projects reaching about 3,34,000 acres were completed by the state government during the first five-year plan (1951-1956) for a total cost of about 29,00,00,000 rupees. Another six irrigation projects reaching about 2,92,000 acres were completed during the second five-year plan (1965-1961). The state government pursued multiple large-scale power generation projects to improve electrification—22,103 villages had electricity in 1966, up from 813 villages in 1951. Five industrial zones were created throughout the state to spur growth in heavy industries and multiple industrial estates were created to encourage smaller industries. The Madras Cultivating Tenants Act of 1956 and the Madras Land Reforms Act of 1962 improved farmers rights. Social welfare schemes aimed at improving conditions for scheduled castes and scheduled tribes as well as women were implemented. Tamil became the official language of the state in 1958, and the first Tamil encyclopedia published by the Tamil Academy was presented in 1962.

Kamaraj resigned in 1963 to focus on the revival of the Congress party. M. Bhakthavatsalam succeeded Kamaraj and would remain Chief Minister until the election of 1967 when power shifted to the Dravida Munnetra Kazhagam.

Rise of Dravidian politics 

Dravidian parties have dominated state politics since 1967. One of the earliest regional parties was the South Indian Welfare Association, which was founded in 1916. It came to be known as the Justice Party after the name of its English-language daily, Justice. Periyar E. V. Ramasamy, renamed the party Dravidar Kazhagam in 1944. DK was a non-political party which demanded the establishment of an independent state called Dravida Nadu. However, due to the differences between its two leaders Periyar and C. N. Annadurai, the party was split. Annadurai left the party to form the Dravida Munnetra Kazhagam (DMK). The DMK decided to enter into politics in 1956.

The Anti-Hindi agitations in the mid-1960s made the DMK more popular and more powerful political force in the state. The DMK routed the Indian National Congress party in the 1967 elections and took control of the state government, ending Congress's stronghold in Tamil Nadu. C. N. Annadurai became the DMK's first Chief Minister, and M. Karunanidhi took over as Chief Minister and party leader after Annadurai's death in 1969. Karunanidhi's leadership was soon challenged by M. G. Ramachandran, popularly known as M.G.R. In 1972, he split from DMK and formed the All India Anna Dravida Munnetra Kazhagam (AIADMK). He was the Chief Minister of the state from 1977 until his death in 1987. After the death of M.G.R, the party split again into two factions, one led by V. N. Janaki Ramachandran, wife of M.G.R, and the other led by J. Jayalalithaa. After the defeat of AIADMK in 1989 assembly polls, both factions were merged and Jayalalithaa took control of the party. She was elected as the general secretary of the unified AIADMK. There have been splits in both the DMK and the AIADMK, but since 1967 one of those two parties has held power in the state. In the State elections after M. G. Ramachandran's death, neither of the two parties could come back to power in consecutive assembly elections. Governments were formed by: DMK in 1989, AIADMK in 1991, DMK alliance in 1996, AIADMK alliance in 2001, DMK alliance in 2006 and AIADMK alliance consecutively in 2011 and 2016.

Tamil nationalism in politics 

Tamil Nationalism has been part of the Tamil political Arena ever since a Tamil identity pride has been created among the Tamil populace in the late 19th century. Dravidian movement and Tamil nationalism rose from the same roots. They differed in very few but were identical in important topics, such as eradication of casteism, promoting religious equality and extermination of untouchability. While Dravidian parties take these topics at the same level of Promotion of Tamil, the Tamil organizations sole priority was promotion of Tamil. On multiple occasions they were religious and sometimes refused to acknowledge the caste problems.

During the Anti Hindi Imposition Movement, the Tamil Nationalist organizations converged with Dravidian parties on the common ground of Protecting and Promoting Tamil. In the next oncoming decades, the relevance of the Tamil Nationalist Parties reduced to a great degree. Still many Tamil Nationalist organizations keep on working on promotion of Tamil identity.

Such parties and their policies can be classified into a wider spectrum. There are organizations which claim every person with an intent to promote Tamil identity as a Tamil. At the same time, few elements classify and deny Tamil identity to the people of Tamil Nadu based on Caste lines, which is in total contrast to the former type.

After the death of Velupillai Prabhakaran, a revival, even though not a big enough to create an impact in political balance, is seen. The success of this new wave is yet to be seen.

Political culture of Tamil Nadu

Social welfare schemes 
Politics in Tamil Nadu has had a strongly socialist character since the rise of Dravidian politics in the 1960s. In Tamil Nadu, AIADMK and DMK are alternately elected by people in Tamil Nadu and a strong third party does not exist. Both AIADMK and DMK, the major political parties in Tamil Nadu, as per their political and economic policy, made sure that the people of the state receive the fruits of the modern technology. Whichever party was in the rule, made sure that all the households have a television set, the womenfolk have access to work on the economy of their family by providing them household appliances and the students have all the necessary tools to reach and complete their education namely bicycle, textbooks, stationery and laptops.

At the same time, the promise of and distribution of freebies is considered and criticized to be a form of bribery, disguised as people welfare. The right wing political parties and economists feel that the fiscal profligacy and handouts don't make economic sense and, importantly, they tend to make people lazy. The leftists and the left leaning parties have raised concerns about the revenue model used for financing the freebie schemes. They accuse the two parties of depoliticizing the electorate and bribing the voters to turn blind eye to the corruptions of the regimes These social welfare schemes provide the Dravidian faction of the Tamil Nadu politics an edge over the other regional and national parties.

Caste politics 
Tamil Nadu has seen numerous caste based parties, serving two purposes. Either to represent the genuine concerns of the oppressed communities or to create Votebanks for ruling parties.

The Dalit political parties, representing the oppressed societies have been fighting for social justice. Typically reservation in education and job opportunities are demanded by such parties. In Tamil Nadu such parties are also supporters of Tamil Nationalism. Rarely some of the parties have claimed that the castes they represent are oppressed by being declared a part of the Scheduled castes list. They demand removal of their caste from Scheduled castes list and to rename their caste.

However, people from the relatively upper castes also have founded political parties. They fear that their opportunities are robbed by the concessions extended to the SC and ST communities. They have demanded to get their castes declared as backward to avail reservation.

The effect of the caste politics is debatable and could not be expected to end in near future. In 2001, the sitting DMK government came up with a huge a alliance with caste parties and was defeated in 2001 assembly election. Still caste based political parties are part of both the ruling and opposition alliances in all the successive elections.

Celebrity worship 

Many people from the Tamil film industry are active in Tamil Nadu politics. Some of the Chief Ministers of Tamil Nadu like M. Karunanidhi, M. G. Ramachandran and J. Jayalalithaa have their background in the Tamil film industry. Kamal Haasan who enjoys a great stardom entered into Tamil Nadu politics in 2018 by starting his his own political party. Rajinikanth who is enjoying a popular status in Tami Nadu was in the race to start a political party in 2020, later reverted the decision due to health issues during covid pandemic. The worship of party leader by members is widely spread in Tamil Nadu, sometimes it reaches a fanatical level. This worship culture originates during the era of M.G.R.

The youngsters were often a factor that changes the dynamic of Tamil Nadu politics, what can be seen in Anti-Hindi agitations of Tamil Nadu, 2013 Anti–Sri Lanka protests and 2017 pro-jallikattu protests.

Political parties in Tamil Nadu 
Political parties in Tamil Nadu are dominated by two major parties, All India Anna Dravida Munnetra Kazhagam (AIADMK), Dravida Munnetra Kazhagam (DMK), along with national parties like Indian National Congress (INC), Bharatiya Janata Party (BJP), Communist Party of India (CPI) and few minor parties such as Pattali Makkal Katchi (PMK), Naam Tamilar Katchi (NTK), CPIM, Makkal Needhi Maiam, Kongu Munnetra Kazhagam, Desiya Murpokku Dravida Kazhagam (DMDK), Tamil Maanila Congress (TMC) etc.,

References

External links